A by-election was held for the New South Wales Legislative Assembly electorate of East Sydney on 15 July 1874 because James Neale resigned.

Dates

Result

James Neale resigned.

See also
Electoral results for the district of East Sydney
List of New South Wales state by-elections

References

1874 elections in Australia
New South Wales state by-elections
1870s in New South Wales